Al Rigga is a rapid transit station on the Red Line of the Dubai Metro in Dubai, UAE, serving the Al Rigga area of Deira.

The station opened as part of the Red Line on 9 September 2009. It is close to Deira Clock Tower, the Delta Centre, and many hotels. The station is also close to a number of bus routes.

References

Railway stations in the United Arab Emirates opened in 2009
Dubai Metro stations